Kärt is an Estonian feminine given name and may refer to:

Kärt Hellerma (born 1956), Estonian journalist, writer, and literary critic
Kärt Jänes-Kapp (1960–2015), Estonian journalist and editor
Kärt Kross-Merilo (born 1968), Estonian actress
Kärt Siilats (born 1980), Estonian high jumper
Kärt Tammjärv (born 1991), Estonian actress
Kärt Tomingas (born 1967), Estonian actress, singer, lecturer, and pedagogue

References

 
Feminine given names
Estonian feminine given names